Coleophora currucipennella is a moth of the family Coleophoridae found in Europe. It was first described by Philipp Christoph Zeller in 1839.

Description
The wingspan is 13–16 mm.

The larvae feed on birch (Betula species), hornbeam (Carpinus betulus), hazel (Corylus avellana), beech (Fagus sylvatica), apple (Malus species), sour cherry (Prunus cerasus), blackthorn (Prunus spinosa}, common pear (Pyrus communis), sessile oak (Quercus petraea), common oak (Quercus robur), northern red ock (Quercus rubra), willow (Salix species) and rowan (Sorbus aucuparia). Full-grown larva live in a dull black pistol case of about 9 mm and with a mouth angle of 80–90° (meaning it stands erect on the leaf). After hibernation, the larvae no longer mine, but rather cause skeleton feeding. Full-grown larvae can be found in early June.

Distribution
The moth is found in most of Europe, except Ireland, the Iberian Peninsula and the Mediterranean Islands.

References

External links

currucipennella
Moths described in 1839
Moths of Europe
Taxa named by Philipp Christoph Zeller